Nicolai Anhorn von Hartwiss  (Николай Андерс фон, де Гартвис, Николай Андреевич; was a Livonian-born, Baltic German, Russian botanist, plant explorer and plant breeder. His education at the university in Dorpat (Livonia) was interrupted by the Napoleonic Wars 1812–1818 when he served in the Russian army. Afterwards he worked on his father's estate and by 1824 was living in Riga and had a collection of 500 varieties of fruit trees and roses. He was then appointed to the Russian Imperial Botanical Garden at Nikita where he served as a director for the rest of his career. He is remembered for his plant collection explorations of Georgia and the Crimea, and for the breeding of roses.

Life
Von Hartwiss was born Ritter (esquire) Nikolaus Ernst Bartholomäus Anhorn von Hartwiss, Hartwiß in 1793 at his father's estate at Kokenhof near Wolmar, Livonia (now Valmiera, Latvia). The family Anhorn von Hartwiss (double name) comes from Switzerland. His grandfather Silvester Samuel (1708–1782) descended from Swiss Protestant pastors and emigrated to Russia. His father, Heinrich Ernst was a registered member of the Livonian nobility (reg. 1769). He married his first cousin Christina Louisa. Nikolaus was their tenth child. By that time Livonia (roughly present day Latvia and the southern part of Estonia) had been absorbed (under the Governorate of Livonia) into the Russian Empire, but the nobility still retained its ancient Baltic German forms and spoke Low German.

Nikolaus was educated at German-speaking Dorpat (now Tartu) university (1809-1812), where his studies were interrupted by Napoleonic wars.

He was an officer of the Russian Army in the Napoleonic Wars 1812–1818, discharged with wounds. This implies that he was (and remained) a subject of the Tsar, not in any sense a Russian citizen.

Von Hartwiss at one time gained practical gardening experience laying out fields of flowers, fruit trees and both exotic and domestic trees on his father's estate.  In 1819–1824 he lived in Riga, gardening and fruit growing, with a collection of 500 varieties of fruit trees and roses.

In 1824 he was appointed by Mikhail Semyonovich Vorontsov, governor-general of New Russia, to the Russian Imperial Botanical Garden at Nikita in Yalta on the south coast of the Crimea. In 1827 he became its second director, which he remained until he died. He extended the Garden's collection of plant varieties from more than a thousand to about three thousand, including the largest collection of fruit varieties in Europe.

From Nikita he organised plant hunting expeditions into the surrounding territories, especially the Crimea and Abkhazia in the Caucasus.

He and his first wife, Elizabeth Feodorovna Baroness von Rosen, had a 500-acre estate called Artek near Bear Mountain (Ayu-Dag) in the Crimea. After the death of his first wife in 1855 he married a young girl from Riga in Simferopol on 2 Feb. 1858, Leontine Werther, who died at the end of the same year giving birth to a daughter.

Exploration

Von Hartwiss collected plants in Georgia and the Crimea. Some species were named by him, some named after him. "Three long expeditions [were made] to the Caucasus in search of new ornamental plants for the Crimea … Caucasian fir, spruce, … Caucasian basswood, rhododendrons, azaleas and other flowering shrubs."

Eponyms
 (Boraginaceae) Cordia hartwissiana Regel
 (Cupressaceae) Juniperus hartwissiana Steven ex Koeppen
 Strandzha oak  (Fagaceae) Quercus hartwissiana Steven 
 (Paeoniaceae) Paeonia hartwissiana hort. ex Trautv.

Plant breeding

Von Hartwiss imported many plants for the Botanic Garden, including roses. In 1827 he began to breed roses. These were partly for the Garden itself, but also for the Alupka Palace of Count (later Prince) Michael Vorontsov. Some thirty of his roses were sold from the Alupka Palace nursery.

Roses bred
Von Hartwiss bred more than 100 varieties of roses at the Nikita Garden.  Two are still growing at the Alupka Palace: 'Comtesse Elizabeth Woronzof' 1829 and 'Belle de Nikita' 1829. There may also be his rose 'Mignonette d'Alupka' 1829, thought by some to be the rose imported into France and sold as 'Maréchal Niel'.  Hartwiss's hand-written 1834 catalogue of roses at Nikita lists scores of roses bred there identified only by description. The Crimean Rose Society – including roses bred after 1834 – lists 127 named varieties.

Sortable selection of Hartwiss-bred roses

References

External links 
 Help Me Find Roses entry on von Hartwiss
 (Russian and English) 

Rose breeders
1793 births
1860 deaths
Russian agronomists
Botanists with author abbreviations
University of Tartu alumni
People from the Governorate of Livonia
19th-century botanists from the Russian Empire
19th-century agronomists